Attack on Pearl Harbor is a combat flight simulation game developed by 3DIVISION and Legendo Entertainment and published by Legendo and CDV Software. The game is based on the Attack on Pearl Harbor and the following Battles of Wake Island, Midway, and the Coral Sea. The game is presented through a third-person perspective. In the single-player campaign, the players assumes control of either a United States Army Air Force pilot or an Imperial Japanese Navy pilot. The multiplayer component allows players to engage in both cooperative and competitive gameplay.

The game was released for Microsoft Windows in July 2007. It received mixed reviews from critics, who generally approved of the gameplay, controls, and graphics, though some were divided on the overall narrative and historical accuracy. The game was later released for WiiWare in July 2010 as Pearl Harbor Trilogy – 1941: Red Sun Rising.

Gameplay 

Attack on Pearl Harbor is a combat flight simulation game that is played from a third-person perspective. In the game's single-player campaign, the player assumes control of one of two fictional pilots: United States Army Air Forces pilot Douglas Knox or Imperial Japanese Navy pilot Zenji Yamada. Both pilots have two single-player campaigns each, beginning during the Attack on Pearl Harbor and chronologically featuring the key battles that followed, including the Battle of Wake Island, Battle of Midway, and Battle of the Coral Sea. The game also features operations prior to the Battle of the Santa Cruz Islands and the Battle of Okinawa for both pilots. The game's cutscenes are presented in a comic book-like fashion.

The player assumes control of several historic aircraft, including the Douglas SBD Dauntless, Aichi D3A, Vought F4U Corsair, and Mitsubishi A6M Zero. If the player fails a mission, planes are deducted from their reserve, and the campaign ends in defeat once all planes are deducted. Aircraft carry unlimited ammunition, limited only by overheating for machine guns and reloading times for rockets, bombs, and torpedoes. The player can view different perspectives of the plane, such as a wing view and a chase view.

The single-player component also features a mode titled Dogfight, wherein the player selects the venue, weather conditions, aircraft type, and difficulty. The game mode endless spawns AI aircraft which attack the player. The player can select from three possible victory conditions: Time Attack, where they must survive for a certain time limit; King of the Sky, where a certain number of enemy craft must be destroyed; or Fly and Die, wherein the game ends when the player is shot down.

The online multiplayer mode for Attack on Pearl Harbor allows players to compete cooperatively and competitively. The multiplayer component features two game modes: Deathmatch, in which the last plane flying wins; and Team Deathmatch, in which the last surviving team wins.

Release 
A single-player demo for Attack on Pearl Harbor was released on the game's website on 18 May 2007. CDV Software revealed that the demo received more than 175,000 downloads. The game was submitted for manufacturing on 5 July 2007, released on 30 July. The game's soundtrack was published on streaming platforms by Mad Villa Tunez on 30 November 2012.

Reception 

Attack on Pearl Harbor received "mixed or average reviews", according to review aggregator Metacritic. Tristan Kalogeropoulos of PALGN wrote that the game offers "great 'arcadey' action and some incredibly fun aerial combat". In a retrospective piece about the game, John Walker of Rock, Paper, Shotgun praised the satisfaction of combat. Conversely, IGNs Charles Onyett concluded that the game "manage[s] to take something as interesting as World War II's air battle over the Pacific and turn it into something as repetitive as bouncing a tennis ball against a wall".

Kalogeropoulos of PALGN lauded the enjoyment of the gameplay and simplicity of the game's controls. PC Gamers John Walker criticized the simplicity and repetition of the game's missions. Johnathan Neuls of Ars Technica described the game's speed controls as "a mess" due to their unpredictability.

Louis Bedigian of GameZone described the graphics as "terrific", praising the satisfaction of effective combat.
Kalogeropoulos of PALGN praised the game's graphics, noting that they are "not overly complicated but ... do a great job of portraying the skies of World War II". Neuls of Ars Technica commended the designs and historical accuracy of the plane designs. GameSpots Brett Todd wrote that the terrain is "a bit odd-looking" but commended the game's technical performance. PC Gamers Walker praised the game's weather and spoke effects, but criticized the lack of detail on buildings and aircraft.

PALGNs Kalogeropoulos felt that the casual nature of the game's historical missions fit well with the overall content. Todd of GameSpot described the missions as "formulaic" but entertaining, preferring the campaign missions over the empty online mode. Neuls of Ars Technica criticized the game's story and historical accuracy, describing it as the "Cliff Notes version" of the battle. IGNs Onyett described the game's action as "so undemanding that it gets boring within about 10 minutes", particularly criticizing the repetition of the missions.

Notes

References

External links 
 

2007 video games
Combat flight simulators
Multiplayer and single-player video games
Pacific War video games
Video games developed in Slovakia
Video games set in Australia
Video games set in Guam
Video games set in Hawaii
Video games set in Indonesia
Video games set in the Northern Mariana Islands
Video games set in Oceania
Video games set in Okinawa Prefecture
Video games set in Palau
Video games set in the Philippines
Video games set in the Solomon Islands
Video games set in the United States
Windows games
World War II video games
CDV Software Entertainment games
Legendo Entertainment games